Sherewad is a village in Hubli Suburban, Dharwad district of Karnataka, India.

Demographics 
As of the 2011 Census of India there were 893 households in Sherewad and a total population of 4,415 consisting of 2,232 males and 2,183 females. There were 539 children ages 0-6.

References

Villages in Dharwad district